Kaitoke (sometimes called Pakuratahi), part of Upper Hutt City, is a locality in the southern North Island of New Zealand. It is located at the northern end of the Hutt Valley, 45 kilometres northeast of Wellington City and six kilometres from the northern end of the Upper Hutt urban area. It also lies at the southern end of the Tararua Ranges.

The New Zealand Ministry for Culture and Heritage gives a translation of "eat worms" for Kaitoke.

The "Puffer" tramping track providing access into the Tararua Forest Park climbs from Kaitoke onto and along the Marchant Ridge. This ridge is the part of the Tararuas that is prominently visible from Wellington. The Marchant Track has a side track leading to the Tauherenikau Valley. The end of the Marchant Ridge (after four hours of 'up hill, all the way, both ways') leads to Mount Alpha, and onto The Southern Crossing. The entire track to Alpha skirts the Hutt Water Collection Area.

The first Youth Hostel in the North Island was established in the old Ministry of Works barracks at Kaitoke, which were behind the Post Office and alongside the Kaitoke Hall. The Post Office, the Hall, and the Youth Hostel were the only buildings of the settlement. Other facilities include a small airstrip operated by the Upper Valley Gliding Club for the purposes of gliding the area's thermals.

The Pakuratahi River flows through the eastern Kaitoke Basin from its source in the Remutaka Ranges. The old route of the Wairarapa Line railway, which closed with the opening of the Rimutaka Tunnel in November 1955, ran from Upper Hutt via Maymorn to Kaitoke and around Goat Rock up the Pakuratahi to the Summit, and from there, because of excessive steepness, the Fell mountain railway system was used to aid trains on the Rimutaka Incline between Summit and Cross Creek. This railway is now the Remutaka Rail Trail. The Hutt River has its source to the north of Kaitoke, and much of the land in the vicinity is used as a water supply reserve. Filming, rafting, swimming and other human activity all take place downstream of the water intake.

The nearby Kaitoke Regional Park was the filming location for exterior shots of Rivendell for the movie The Lord of the Rings: The Fellowship of the Ring.

References

Upper Hutt